Bakwan is a vegetable fritter or gorengan from Indonesian cuisine. Bakwan are usually sold by traveling street vendors. The ingredients are vegetables; usually beansprouts, shredded cabbages and carrots, battered and deep fried in cooking oil. In West Java bakwan is known as 'bala-bala' and in Semarang is called 'badak'. It is similar to Japanese yasai tenpura (vegetable tempura), Korean pajeon or Filipino ukoy.

Variations
Bakwan usually consists of vegetables, however another variation called 'bakwan udang' adds whole shrimp to the batter and is sold in snack stands at the marketplace. Because of its similarity, the term 'bakwan' is often interchangeable with 'perkedel'. For example, the Indonesian corn fritters are often called either 'perkedel jagung' or 'bakwan jagung'.

In East Java, bakwan refers to fried wonton with filling; served with tofu, noodles and meatballs in a soupy broth. The dough filling is a mixture of ground meat or fish with flour, wrapped in wonton skin and fried. This kind of bakwan is similar to bakso meatball soup, and commonly known as 'Bakwan Malang' or 'Bakwan Surabaya' in reference to their cities of origin; Malang and Surabaya in East Java.

Originally Bakwan comes from a Chinese recipe along with Bakpao (Meatbun), Bakso (Meatball), Bakmie (Meat Noodle), and bakpia.

Gallery

See also

 Perkedel
 Tahu campur
 Tauge goreng
 Chinese Indonesian cuisine
 Indonesian cuisine

References

Fritters
Street food in Indonesia